Brasilennea guttula is a fossil species of air-breathing land snail, a terrestrial pulmonate gastropod mollusc in the family Cerionidae, from the Paleocene Itaboraí Basin, Brazil. Brasilennea guttula shows a peculiar shell shape, distinct from the other species in the genus; the shape is reminiscent of a water drop, which led to the specific epithet of Brasilennea guttula.

References

Cerionidae
Paleocene gastropods
Gastropods described in 2012